Beyeria is a genus of shrubs and small trees in the family Euphorbiaceae known as turpentine bushes. It was first described as a genus in 1844. The entire genus  is endemic to Australia.

Species

formerly included
moved to other genera: Bertya Shonia 
 B. bickertonensis - Shonia bickertonensis
 B. tristigma - Shonia tristigma 
 B. virgata - Bertya virgata

References 

Euphorbiaceae genera
Crotonoideae
Endemic flora of Australia
Taxa named by Friedrich Anton Wilhelm Miquel